Melanie Joy Mark (born 1975), also known by her Nisga'a name Hli Haykwhl Ẃii Xsgaak, is a Canadian politician in the province of British Columbia. A member of the New Democratic Party (NDP), she has served as the Member of the Legislative Assembly (MLA) for Vancouver-Mount Pleasant since 2016. From 2017 to 2020, she served as Minister of Advanced Education and Skills Training; from 2020 to 2022, she served as Minister of Tourism, Arts, Culture and Sport. Mark is the first First Nations woman elected to the Legislative Assembly of British Columbia, and the first First Nations woman to serve in the Cabinet of British Columbia. On February 22, 2023, Mark announced her intention to resign as MLA and cabinet minister.

Biography
Born of Nisga'a, Gitxsan, Cree, and Ojibway ancestry, Mark was raised in Vancouver's Downtown Eastside neighbourhood. She credits her aunts and grandparents with helping her get through the death of her younger brother who was killed by a semi trailer while riding a bicycle, her mother's addiction and homelessness, and her father's overdose.

After attending six different high schools, including Van Tech, Charles Tupper, and Ladysmith, she became the first person in her family to graduate from high school and attend college and university. She received a diploma in criminology from a joint program offered by Native Education College and Douglas College, then went on to major in political science and minor in sociology at Simon Fraser University (SFU), earning a bachelor of arts degree in 2005. She also received an advanced executive certificate from Queen's School of Business. She worked with the Native Court Workers' Association, Covenant House, the Royal Canadian Mounted Police in Hazelton as a summer student, and as the national aboriginal project coordinator for Save the Children Canada's Sacred Lives Project.

From 2000 to 2006, Mark served as president of the Urban Native Youth Association. She is the co-founder of the Vancouver Aboriginal Community Policing Centre. Beginning in 2007, she worked for eight years in the Office of the Representative for Children and Youth, becoming an associate deputy representative in 2013. The Office is the supporting agency for the Representative for Children and Youth, a non-partisan officer of the BC Legislature reporting directly to the BC Legislative Assembly, mandated to advocate for young people and families going through the provincial child and youth welfare system.

In 2006, Mark received the YWCA Vancouver Young Woman of Distinction Award, and in 2015, she received the Chief Joe Mathias Leadership Award from the Native Education College. In 2016, she was the recipient of the inaugural Janusz Korczak Medal for Children's Rights Advocacy and in 2018, she was the recipient of the Stenberg College, Be the Change, Community Leadership Award.

Mark has attention deficit hyperactivity disorder (ADHD).

Politics

After Jenny Kwan announced she would be resigning as MLA of Vancouver-Mount Pleasant to stand in the 2015 federal election, Melanie Mark entered the nomination contest to be the New Democratic Party (NDP)'s candidate for the ensuing by-election. On June 14, 2015, she defeated Diana Day for the NDP nomination. When the by-election was held on February 2, 2016,  Mark was elected with 61% of the vote, defeating BC Liberal Party candidate Gavin Dew and Green Party of British Columbia candidate Pete Fry. She became the first Indigenous woman elected to the Legislature of British Columbia. Following the 2017 general election, after which the NDP formed government, Mark was named as the Minister of Advanced Education in July 2017.

As Minister of Advanced Education, Skills and Training, Mark oversaw policy changes that made college and university more accessible to more British Columbians. She created the Provincial Tuition Waiver program, which supports youth in and from the foster system to access post secondary education tuition free. She oversaw the creation of the B.C. Access Grant, which provides upfront, non-repayable financial assistance to low- and middle-income students enrolled in full-time studies at B.C. colleges and universities, as well as the elimination of fees for Adult Basic Education and English language learning programs and interest on provincial student loans.

Following the 2020 election, Mark was named the Minister of Tourism, Arts, Culture and Sport on November 26. On September 28, 2022, Mark announced that she would step down from cabinet in order to take medical leave, and was appointed a minister without portfolio.

On February 22, 2023, Mark announced her resignation as MLA and cabinet minister. In her resignation speech, Mark criticized how "institutions fundamentally resist change ... particularly colonial institutions and government at large," and said that she would "continue to advocate and fight from outside of this House." Mark also went on to state that the "nastiness from white men in here is awful."

Electoral record

References

External links

MLA: Hon. Melanie Mark - Legislative Assembly of British Columbia

British Columbia New Democratic Party MLAs
Women government ministers of Canada
1975 births
Living people
Members of the Executive Council of British Columbia
Politicians from Vancouver
Women MLAs in British Columbia
First Nations women in politics
Year of birth missing (living people)
21st-century Canadian politicians
21st-century Canadian women politicians
First Nations politicians
Simon Fraser University alumni
Nisga'a people
Cree people
Ojibwe people
Gitxsan people